The 2020 Preakness Stakes was the 145th Preakness Stakes, a Grade I stakes race for three-year-old Thoroughbreds at a distance of  miles (1.9 km). The race is one leg of the American Triple Crown and is held annually at Pimlico Race Course in Baltimore, Maryland.

The Preakness is regularly scheduled to be held on the third Saturday in May, two weeks after the Kentucky Derby, but the 2020 running was rescheduled to Saturday, October 3, due to the COVID-19 pandemic. On September 2, it was announced that the race would be held without spectators, and it was won by filly Swiss Skydiver in the second-fastest time ever.

Background
This was the first time since the 1945 Triple Crown races were affected by World War II that the event took place outside of its regular May schedule. With the Belmont Stakes run on June 20 and the Kentucky Derby on September 5, the Preakness became the final leg of the 2020 Triple Crown. As different horses won the Belmont and the Kentucky Derby, it was established prior to the Preakness that there would be no Triple Crown winner in 2020.

The race provided the winner with a berth in the Breeders' Cup Classic, held a month later on November 7.

Per a decision by the Maryland Jockey Club, "Maryland, My Maryland" was not played before the Preakness, as had been prior tradition—the song "which celebrates the Confederacy, is considered by some to be racist".

Field
On September 22, the owners of Belmont Stakes winner Tiz the Law announced that he would not run in the Preakness. In his absence, the favorite was Authentic, the winner of the Kentucky Derby and Haskell Invitational. When entries were taken on September 28, Authentic drew post position 9 in a field of eleven. Key rivals were:
 Art Collector – winner of the Blue Grass Stakes and the Ellis Park Derby
 Thousand Words – winner of the Shared Belief Stakes
 Swiss Skydiver – winner of the Alabama Stakes, second in the Blue Grass Stakes and Kentucky Oaks
 Mr. Big News – third in the Kentucky Derby

Results

Source:

Payout

 $1 Exacta (4–9) $37.80
 $1 Trifecta (4–9–6) $1,205.70
 $1 Superfecta (4–9–6–3) $5,053.00
 $1 Super High Five (4–9–6–3–8) $64,812.60

Times:  mile – 0:24.48;   mile – 0:47.65;  mile – 1:11.24; mile – 1:34.74;  final – 1:53.28.
Splits for each quarter-mile: (:24.48) (:23.17) (:23.59) (:23.50) (:18.54 for final )

Source:

Notes

References

External links 
 
 Preakness Stakes 2020: Swiss Skydiver becomes sixth filly to win in 145 runnings from NBC Sports via YouTube

2020
2020 in horse racing
2020 in American sports
October 2020 sports events in the United States
Horse races in Maryland
2020 in sports in Maryland
Sports events postponed due to the COVID-19 pandemic